24/Seven is the third studio album by American boy band Big Time Rush, released on June 7, 2013 by Columbia Records. The album experiments with a dance-rock and R&B sound. It also serves as the follow-up to their second studio album Elevate. The band worked with producers Matt Squire and Damon Sharpe, as they had done in the past, in an effort to mature their sound yet not stray away from their well-known qualities. The four members co-wrote 13 songs (including five deluxe edition bonus tracks) with several hired songwriters. It is the last album to be released by the band as they stopped performing in 2014, but seven years later, they officially announced their comeback on social media in July 2021.

Background and composition
Beginning on April 26, 2013, Big Time Rush began releasing photos for various songs on the album via Instagram and Google Plus. The band revealed the final track listing for the album on April 29, 2013 via Entertainment Weekly.

Musically, 24/Seven marks a shift on the band's signature sound showcasing a more mature, organic and "down-to-earth pop" direction than their previous two albums, BTR and Elevate. In contrast with their past releases, the songs were written primarily by the band, with the exception of the songs "Like Nobody's Around" and "Song for You", each song on the album was either written or co-written by a member of the band. The album features duo Karmin, which appears on the track "Song for You", and rapper Jake Miller on deluxe edition bonus track "Lost in Love". The first version of the song "Love Me Again" was written by Big Time Rush, but Nickelodeon altered the song to be more "kid-friendly".

Promotional single
"Like Nobody's Around" was released with the pre-order of the album on March 23, 2013. The video references other successful boy bands in past decades as The Ink Spots (1940s/1950s), The Temptations (1960s), The Jackson 5 (1970s), New Kids on the Block (1980s), Backstreet Boys (1990s) and NSYNC (2000s). The music video premiered on Nickelodeon during the 2013 Kids' Choice Awards.

Critical reception

The album received mixed to positive reviews from critics. Matt Collar of AllMusic gave the album a 3.5 out of 5 stars. He praised the "vocal talents" of the group members and stated, "the album has a brightly positive vibe with songs about hanging out, having fun, and falling in love." He ended off stating, "Whether you’re looking for a perfect summer soundtrack or simply an album for hanging out with your friends after school, Big Time Rush's 24/Seven is round the clock fun."

Commercial performance 
In the United States, the album debuted at number four on the Billboard 200 chart, selling 35,000 album-equivalent units for the week ending June 29, 2013, according to Nielsen Music. However, original estimates for the album were aimed at upwards of 45,000 copies. Additionally, 24/Seven was the fourth best-selling album of the week, ranking at number four on the publication's Top Album Sales component chart. It became the group's second top-five album, following their eponymous debut album that reached a peak of number three in 2010. However, it marked the lowest first week sales for the quartet, with their previous two BTR and Elevate selling 67,000 copies and 70,000 copies in their first weeks, respectively. The following week, the record dropped 33 positions on the Billboard 200, charting at number 37 for the week ending July 6, 2013. For the next three weeks, the album continued to drop down the charts, before rising slightly from number 54 to number 50, during the week of July 27. 24/Seven was present for a total of ten consecutive weeks on the chart, before reaching its final position for the week ending August 31, being number 154. It topped Billboard'''s Kid Albums and Top Soundtrack charts for five consecutive weeks, becoming the "Hot Shot Debut" of the week and spending a total of 22 weeks on the component chart.

Outside of the US, 24/Seven entered the charts of many European countries. In Poland, 24/Seven peaked at number 38 according to the Polish Society of the Phonographic Industry. The album was also certified Gold in Mexico.

Track listing

Personnel
Credits from 24/Seven'' adapted from album liner notes.

Mitch Allen – producer
Austin Bisnow – producer
The Blueprint – producer
Dan Brook – producer
Doug Cohn – executive in charge of music
Chris DeStefano – producer
Maria Egan – A&R
Jason Evigan – producer
Scott Fellows – executive producer
Tim Friesen – assistant
Tim Frisen – assistant, mixing assistant
Serban Ghenea – mixing
Larry Goetz – engineer
Jeff Halatrax – producer
Logan Henderson – vocals
Karmin – featured artist, vocals
Brian Malouf – mixing
Stephen Marcussen – mastering

Maria Paula Marulanda – art direction, design
James Maslow – vocals
Jake Miller – vocals
Jared Mink – A&R
Alexei Misoul - producer
Michael Muller – photography
Matt Nyberg – additional production
OFM – producer
Carlos Pena, Jr. – vocals
Sean Phelan – mixing
Gelareh Rouzbehani – A&R
Eric Sanicola – engineer, producer
Kendall Schmidt – vocals
Damon Sharpe – engineer, producer
Matt Squire – engineer, producer
Steve Tippeconnic – engineer
Miles Walker – mixing

Charts

Weekly charts

Year-end charts

Certifications

Release history

References

2013 albums
Albums produced by Matt Squire
Big Time Rush albums
Columbia Records albums